The People vs. is the debut solo studio album by American rapper Trick Trick. It was released on December 27, 2005 via WonderBoy Entertainment/Motown. Recording sessions took place at Batcave, at 54 Sound in Detroit, at X-Labs, at Doppler Studios in Atlanta, at Area 51, Brooklyn, and at Studio 612 in Bealeton, Virginia. Production was handled by Eminem, Mr. Porter, Jazze Pha and Trick Trick himself. It features guest appearances from his brother and Goon Sqwad bandmate Diezel, one-half of D12 members (Eminem, Kon Artis and Proof), Miz Korona, Obie Trice and Jazze Pha. The album peaked at number 115 on the Billboard 200. It spawned one single and music video for "Welcome 2 Detroit".

Track listing

Notes
 signifies an additional producer.
Sample credits
Track 8 contains elements from "Don't Think About It" written by Al Hudson, Cuba Gregory, Irene Perkins and Valdez Brantley, and performed by One Way.
At the end of track 3, MC Ren's verse of Fuck tha Police can be heard in the background.

Personnel
Christian Mathis – vocals, producer (tracks: 1, 2, 4, 8, 9, 11–16), additional producer (track 7), recording (tracks: 1–4, 6, 7, 9-16), mixing (tracks: 1, 2, 4, 9, 11–16), executive producer
Marshall Mathers – vocals & producer (tracks: 3, 7), mixing & recording (track 3)
Phalon Alexander – vocals & producer (track 5)
Denaun Porter – vocals & producer (tracks: 6, 10)
DeShaun Holton – vocals (track 7)
Obie Trice – vocals (track 13)
Paula Smiley – vocals (track 14)
Kameel Mathis – vocals (track 15)
Steven King – guitar & mixing (track 3), bass (track 7)
Luis Resto – keyboards & additional producer (track 3), piano (track 7)
Leslie Brathwaite – mixing (track 5)
Michael "Mike Chav" Chavarria – mixing & recording (tracks: 6, 10)
Mike Strange – mixing & recording (track 7)
Tony Campana – recording (track 7)
Chris Gehringer – mastering
Eric T. Nicks – co-executive producer
Kyle "Kyledidthis" Goen – art direction, design
Roger Erickson – photography

Charts

References

External links

Motown albums
2005 debut albums
Trick-Trick albums
Albums produced by Eminem
Albums produced by Jazze Pha
Albums produced by Mr. Porter
Gangsta rap albums by American artists